HOPE (Hold On Pain Ends) Charitable Trust is a not for profit organization in Kerala that is engaged in humanitarian work and awareness programs for those in distress. The organization was founded in January 2014 by Mahesh Parameswaran Nair (an IT professional) who started with the support of family and friends. The organization later registered volunteers who collectively do a diverse range of social work. As reported in 2019, the organization had 1500 volunteers.

Work and activities 
The idea which initially started through Facebook has become a commendable endeavour to serve the needful and general society. HOPE organizes blood donation camps, organ donation awareness camps, anti-narcotics awareness and awareness camp on cancer care  for life and also do activities like building homes for poor, creating rehabilitation and shelter homes, rehabilitation of people living on streets or those who are disabled, educational aid, medical assistance (donating wheel chairs, supporting people in old age (medicines, food and provisions), arranging funds for surgeries and helping with organ donation), marriage assistance, financial assistance and cleaning drives. In March 2019, the organization adopted the Attinkara colony (Beemapally) to help with drainage leaks, dilapidated houses, unpaved roads and lack of water supply. The organisation encouraged women empowerment by supporting small scale businesses in the communities.

During the COVID 19 Pandemic, HOPE launched 'Back to Home' program and helped stranded people to come back home - including nurses and students. The volunteers arranged for smartphones, laptops and internet connection for underprivileged students for uninterrupted education and sanitary pads for menstrual hygiene. A dress bank was set up by the organization to support with clothes apart from food and medicine related assistance. Prior to this, HOPE had helped those in need during the floods as well.

H.O.P.E is now a family of volunteers ranging from IT professionals, doctors, police officers, architects, MBA students, and various other college students.

Awards 

 Youth Icon Award from Dr Shashi Tharoor
Nirbhaya Indian Icon Award

References 

Health charities in India
Charities based in India
Non-profit organisations based in India